The 2011 Asian Women's Junior Handball Championship (11th tournament) took place in Almaty from September 14–20. It acts as the Asian qualifying tournament for the 2012 Women's Junior World Handball Championship.

Draw

* Malaysia withdrew, Following this Iran replaced Malaysia in Group B to balance the number of teams in each group.

Preliminary round

Group A

Group B

Placement 5th–8th

7th/8th

5th/6th

Final round

Semifinals

Bronze medal match

Gold medal match

Final standing

References

www.handball.jp

External links
www.asianhandball.org

International handball competitions hosted by Kazakhstan
Asian Women's Junior Handball Championship, 2011
Asia
Asian Handball Championships